Jan Szwarc (born 8 July 1946 in Ustroń) is a Polish politician. He was elected to Sejm on 25 September 2005, getting 7642 votes in 27 Bielsko-Biała district as a candidate from Democratic Left Alliance list.

He was also a member of Sejm 2001-2005.

See also
 Members of Polish Sejm 2005-2007

External links
 Jan Szwarc - parliamentary page - includes declarations of interest, voting record, and transcripts of speeches.

1946 births
Living people
Mayors of places in Poland
Democratic Left Alliance politicians
Members of the Polish Sejm 2001–2005
Members of the Polish Sejm 2005–2007
People from Ustroń